Pioneer Peak (Ahtna: Tnel'aay; Dena'ina: Dnal'iy) is a  mountain in the Chugach Mountains in the U.S. state of Alaska. Located beside the Knik River just nine miles (14.5 km) south of Palmer and about six miles outside the Municipality of Anchorage limits, it is a prominent landmark in the Matanuska-Susitna Valley, as well as a popular hiking destination. Its Ahtna name means "the object is standing still" and its Dena'ina name means "the one that watches us". The name was given in 1939 in honor of the pioneers of the Matanuska agricultural colony of the mid-1930s.  The Pioneer Ridge Trail leads up the eastern shoulder, beginning below 200', it allows access to the South summit. The North summit, and true summit of Pioneer Peak does not have a trail, and advanced mountaineering techniques are required. The first ascent of this peak was made June 1936 by Vernon Haik and John Wolffe via the Northwest Face.

Climate

Based on the Köppen climate classification, Pioneer Peak is located in a subarctic climate zone with long, cold, snowy winters, and mild summers. Weather systems coming off the Gulf of Alaska are forced upwards by the Chugach Mountains (orographic lift), causing heavy precipitation in the form of rainfall and snowfall. Temperatures can drop below −20 °C with wind chill factors below −30 °C. The months May through June offer the most favorable weather for climbing or viewing.

See also

List of mountain peaks of Alaska
Geography of Alaska

References

Gallery

External links
 Weather forecast: Pioneer Peak

Mountains of Matanuska-Susitna Borough, Alaska
Mountains of Alaska